Imran Nazir (born 16 December 1981) is a Pakistani former cricketer who played for the Pakistan national cricket team between 1999 and 2012 and was widely known to be a hard hitting opening batter.

Domestic career
In 2008, Nazir signed for the Indian Cricket League and played for the Lahore Badshahs. He scored 111 runs not out, off just 44 deliveries, against the Hyderabad Heroes in the third of the best of three finals of the tournament and helped his team achieve victory. After signing up for the Indian Cricket League, his chances of ever playing again for Pakistan looked slim. However, on 2 February 2009, a Pakistani court suspended the ban on Indian Cricket League players, which paved the way for Nazir to make a return to the One Day International and Twenty20 squad during their tour of Sri Lanka in August 2009.

Since then, he has played two National T20 cups. He was selected for the Hong Kong Sixes tournament 2010 in Hong Kong as a member of the Pakistani squad. The final match, which was in Pakistan's favour, was lost due to Imran Nazir's bowling. 46 runs were required from the last 8-ball over but Imran Nazir gave away 48 runs in 7 balls.

In Twenty20 games he has a bowling average of 1.00 and in his 8 deliveries he has 3 wickets a strike rate of less than 3. He has also played for Dhaka Dynamites in Bangladesh's NCL T20 Bangladesh.
He has played for Dhaka Gladiators in Bangladesh Premier League (BPL). He has played 7 matches in BPL and has scored 207 runs with an average of 41.4 runs per game. He has a strike rate of 150. His highest score is 58 and he has scored 2 half centuries in this tournament and has hit twenty one 4s and nine 6s. He has played for Lahore Qalandars in 2018 Abu Dhabi T20 Trophy.

International career
Nazir made his debut in Test cricket in March 1999 against Sri Lanka at Lahore in Pakistan, and his One Day International debut against the same opposition at Visakhapatnam in India. He played in 8 Test matches between 1999–2002 and secured a spot in the Pakistan squad since 2002. He also played in One Day International arena, but he could never cement his place in the squad. The emergence of several Pakistan opening batsmen such as Imran Farhat, Mohammad Hafeez, Yasir Hameed, Taufeeq Umar, and Salman Butt kept him out of the national side. However, he displayed excellent cricketing performances in first-class cricket.

Nazir made his return to the national team in the second One Day International against South Africa in February 2007 during Pakistan's tour of South Africa. He impressed the Pakistan national selectors with his innings of 57 runs from just 39 deliveries, though he struggled to score runs during the rest of the tournament.

Nazir was named in Pakistan's squad for the 2007 World Cup. He scored 160 runs against Zimbabwe in Pakistan's last match during the 2007 Cricket World Cup, after being knocked out by Ireland.

It was the second highest score by a Pakistani batter and the eighth highest score by any batter in World Cup history and his 8 sixes equalled the World Cup record of Australian batter, Ricky Ponting. It was also the highest runs he scored in List A cricket. He now remains a regular member of Pakistan's Twenty20 squads.

He was given another chance against New Zealand int two T20I's held in Dubai which Pakistan won 2–0. Next time, he was given a chance against Australia in only T20I in Australia but could not bat much. He showed the same form against England in February 2010 in two T2OI's and was consequently dropped from the Pakistani side.

Nazir was recalled to the Pakistan team in September 2012 for the Twenty20 series against Australia and the following ICC World Twenty20 which was held in Sri Lanka. He scored 153 runs in 6 matches with a reasonable average of 25.50 and with a marvelous strike rate of 150.00 which included a match winning innings of 72 against Bangladesh. Nazir has not played international cricket since October 2012.

Charity work
In May 2011, Nazir made a surprise guest appearance at a charity cricket match at Luton Town Football Club between a football legends team and Luton Pakistanis CC. The event was staged to promote community cohesion in the town, as well as raise money for a cancer charity.

Personal life
Imran Nazir has one brother (Mushtaq Nazir) . He is married to Amber Hafeez. His wedding was held in 2009. Imran Nazir has told that his elder brother was his cricketing idol during his childhood.

Nazir suffered a joint problem which had him bedridden for four and a half years. "I couldn’t use my hands. I was unable to fully bend my fingers, there was stiffness. If I was to bend my arm, there was a locking of the elbow joint Every joint in my body ached. I couldn’t get up, I couldn’t lie down, I couldn’t sleep", said Nazir. He was able to resume playing cricket in 2018 after receiving stem cell therapy and platelet-rich plasma therapy.

References

External links

1981 births
Living people
Pakistan One Day International cricketers
Cricketers at the 2007 Cricket World Cup
Pakistan Test cricketers
Pakistan Twenty20 International cricketers
Zarai Taraqiati Bank Limited cricketers
ICL Pakistan XI cricketers
Lahore Badshahs cricketers
Pakistani cricketers
Cricketers from Gujranwala
Water and Power Development Authority cricketers
Sheikhupura cricketers
National Bank of Pakistan cricketers
Sialkot cricketers
Sialkot Stallions cricketers
Peshawar Panthers cricketers
Dhaka Division cricketers
Dhaka Dominators cricketers
Nagenahira Nagas cricketers
Punjab (Pakistan) cricketers